Interposition is a claimed right of a U.S. state to oppose actions of the federal government that the state deems unconstitutional. Under the theory of interposition, a state assumes the right to "interpose" itself between the federal government and the people of the state by taking action to prevent the federal government from enforcing laws that the state considers unconstitutional. 

The theory of interposition is grounded in the text of the Tenth Amendment, which states: "The powers not delegated to the United States by the Constitution, nor prohibited by it to the states, are reserved to the states respectively, or to the people."

In Cooper v. Aaron, 358 U.S. 1 (1958), the Supreme Court of the United States rejected interposition explicitly. The Supreme Court and the lower federal courts have consistently held that the power to declare federal laws unconstitutional lies with the federal judiciary, not with the states.  The courts have held that interposition is not a valid constitutional doctrine when invoked to block enforcement of federal law.

Interposition is closely related to the theory of nullification, which holds that the states have the right to nullify federal laws that are deemed unconstitutional and to prevent enforcement of such laws within their borders.

Though interposition and nullification are similar, there are some differences. Nullification is an act of an individual state, while interposition was conceived as an action that would be undertaken by states acting jointly. Nullification is a declaration by a state that a federal law is unconstitutional accompanied by a declaration that the law is void and may not be enforced in the state. Interposition also involves a declaration by a state that a federal law is unconstitutional, but interposition as originally conceived does not result in a declaration by the state that the federal law may not be enforced in the state. Rather, the law would still be enforced. Thus, interposition may be seen as more moderate than nullification.

There are various actions that a state might take to "interpose" itself once it has determined that a federal law is unconstitutional. These actions include communicating with other states about the unconstitutional law, attempting to enlist the support of other states, petitioning Congress to repeal the law, introducing Constitutional amendments in Congress, or calling a constitutional convention.

Interposition and nullification often are discussed together, and many of the same principles apply to both theories.  In practice, the terms nullification and interposition often have been used indistinguishably. John C. Calhoun indicated that these terms were interchangeable, stating: "This right of interposition, thus solemnly asserted by the State of Virginia, be it called what it may — State-right, veto, nullification, or by any other name — I conceive to be the fundamental principle of our system." During the fight over desegregation of the schools in the south in the 1950s, a number of southern states tried to preserve their segregated schools by passing so-called "Acts of Interposition" that actually would have had the effect of nullification, if they had been valid. These acts were struck down by the courts, whether labelled acts of interposition or nullification.

Virginia Resolution

Interposition was first suggested in the Virginia Resolution of 1798, written by James Madison, which stated:

That this Assembly doth explicitly and peremptorily declare, that it views the powers of the federal government, as resulting from the compact, to which the states are parties; as limited by the plain sense and intention of the instrument constituting the compact; as no further valid that they are authorized by the grants enumerated in that compact; and that in case of a deliberate, palpable, and dangerous exercise of other powers, not granted by the said compact, the states who are parties thereto, have the right, and are in duty bound, to interpose for arresting the progress of the evil, and for maintaining within their respective limits, the authorities, rights and liberties appertaining to them.

By this statement, James Madison asserted that the states are "duty bound to interpose" to prevent the harm that would result from a "deliberate, palpable, and dangerous" unconstitutional action by the federal government. Madison did not specify the procedural legal details of how this interposition would be enacted or what result it would have. The Virginia Resolution, unlike the contemporaneous Kentucky Resolutions, did not assert that the states may declare a federal law null and void. The Virginia Resolution thus is sometimes considered to be more tempered than the Kentucky Resolutions, which assert that a state may nullify unconstitutional federal laws.

The Kentucky and Virginia Resolutions were not accepted by any of the other states. Seven states formally responded to Kentucky and Virginia by rejecting the resolutions and three other states passed resolutions expressing disapproval. At least six states responded to the Resolutions by taking the position that the constitutionality of acts of Congress is a question for the federal courts, not the state legislatures. For example, Vermont's resolution stated: "That the General Assembly of the state of Vermont do highly disapprove of the resolutions of the General Assembly of Virginia, as being unconstitutional in their nature, and dangerous in their tendency. It belongs not to state legislatures to decide on the constitutionality of laws made by the general government; this power being exclusively vested in the judiciary courts of the Union."

In 1800, the Virginia Legislature issued a report responding to the criticism of the Virginia Resolution. Madison wrote the Report of 1800. Madison affirmed each part of the Virginia Resolution, and again argued that the states have the right to interpose when they believe a federal law is unconstitutional. He explained that a state's act of interposition, unlike a judicial interpretation of the Constitution, has no legal effect. Rather, when the states interpose and declare a federal law unconstitutional, these declarations "are expressions of opinion, unaccompanied with any other effect than what they may produce on opinion, by exciting reflection. The expositions of the judiciary, on the other hand, are carried into immediate effect by force." Madison explained that the purpose of a state's declaration of unconstitutionality is to mobilize opposition to the federal law and to enlist the cooperation of other states. Madison said that the states might take various types of joint action to remedy the situation, such as jointly applying to Congress for repeal of the law, instructing their senators to submit a constitutional amendment, or calling a convention to propose constitutional amendments.

During the Nullification Crisis of the 1830s, Madison further explained the concept of interposition as set forth in his Virginia Resolution. Madison denied that any single state had the right to unilaterally determine that a federal statute is unconstitutional. Madison wrote, "But it follows, from no view of the subject, that a nullification of a law of the U. S. can as is now contended, belong rightfully to a single State, as one of the parties to the Constitution; the State not ceasing to avow its adherence to the Constitution. A plainer contradiction in terms, or a more fatal inlet to anarchy, cannot be imagined."   Rather, the interposition contemplated by Madison would be "a concurring and cooperating interposition of the States, not that of a single State." Madison argued that interposition would involve some sort of joint action among the states, such as amending the Constitution.

Interposition attempts in the 19th century

During the 19th century, several states attempted or threatened interposition or nullification. These states often referred to the Virginia Resolution and used the language of interposition, even though they often were attempting or threatening nullification. None of these interposition attempts was legally upheld. The Supreme Court ruled against various interposition and nullification attempts in a series of cases, starting in 1809. The Civil War put an end to most interposition attempts.

School desegregation

Several southern states attempted to use interposition in the 1950s after the Supreme Court's decision in Brown v. Board of Education, which ruled that segregated schools violate the Constitution. Many people in southern states strongly opposed the Brown decision. They argued that the Brown decision was an unconstitutional infringement on states' rights, and that the states had the power to prevent that decision from being enforced within their borders. James J. Kilpatrick, an editor of the Richmond News Leader, wrote a series of editorials urging "massive resistance" to integration of the schools. Kilpatrick revived the idea of interposition by the states as a constitutional basis for resisting federal government action. At least ten southern states passed interposition or nullification laws in an effort to prevent integration of their schools.

In the case of Cooper v. Aaron, 358 U.S. 1 (1958), the Supreme Court rejected the Arkansas effort to use nullification and interposition. The state of Arkansas passed several laws in an effort to prevent the integration of its schools. The Supreme Court, in a unanimous decision, held that state governments had no power to nullify the Brown decision. The Supreme Court held that the Brown decision and its implementation "can neither be nullified openly and directly by state legislators or state executive or judicial officers nor nullified indirectly by them through evasive schemes for segregation whether attempted 'ingeniously or ingenuously. Thus, Cooper v. Aaron directly held that state attempts to nullify federal law are ineffective.

In a similar case arising from Louisiana's interposition act, the Supreme Court affirmed the decision of a federal district court that rejected interposition. The district court's decision reviewed the theory of interposition and found no basis in the Constitution for interposition. The district court stated: "The conclusion is clear that interposition is not a constitutional doctrine. If taken seriously, it is illegal defiance of constitutional authority. Otherwise, 'it amounted to no more than a protest, an escape valve through which the legislators blew off steam to relieve their tensions.' ... However solemn or spirited, interposition resolutions have no legal efficacy."

Interposition and nullification were referenced by Dr. Martin Luther King Jr. in his August 1963 "I Have a Dream" speech, at the March on Washington for Jobs and Freedom:

I have a dream that one day down in Alabama with its vicious racists, with its governor having his lips dripping with the words of interposition and nullification, one day right there in Alabama little black boys and black girls will be able to join hands with little white boys and white girls as sisters and brothers.

Contemporary debate

Interposition and nullification have been raised recently in several state legislatures. Some legislators argue that the states should use these theories to declare unconstitutional certain acts of Congress, especially including the Patient Protection and Affordable Care Act of 2010. Interposition or nullification bills have been introduced in several state legislatures. Opponents respond that interposition is not a valid constitutional doctrine and has been discredited.

See also
Sherman Booth, an example interposition from Wisconsin
Lesser magistrate

References

External links

Copy and transcript of Florida's Interposition Resolution in 1957; made available for public use by the State Archives of Florida

Political history of the United States
Nullification (U.S. Constitution)
John C. Calhoun